Events in the year 1712 in Japan.

Incumbents
Monarch: Nakamikado

Births
January 28 - Tokugawa Ieshige (d. 1761), shōgun

 
1710s in Japan
Japan
Years of the 18th century in Japan